Subdivisions of Kyiv, the capital of Ukraine, include the formal administrative subdivision into urban districts (raions) and the more detailed informal subdivision into historical neighborhoods. Kyiv is divided in two halves split by Dnieper, therefore there exist two important parts "left-bank Kyiv" and "right-bank Kyiv" in reference to the Dnieper.

History of subdivision
The first known formal subdivision of Kyiv dates to 1810 when the city was subdivided into 4 parts: Pechersk, Starokyiv, and the first and the second parts of Podil. In 1833–1834 according to Tsar Nicholas I's decree, Kyiv was subdivided into 6 police districts; later being increased to 10. As of 1917, there were 8 district councils (Duma), which were reorganized by Pavlo Skoropadskyi into 17 raions. In 1924, Bolsheviks reorganized them into the bigger six party-administrated districts with various sub-districts under Hryhoriy Hrynko administration. Districts of the city that start with the letter "D" are located on the left bank of Dnieper and until 1927 were part of Chernigov Governorate with Darnytsia being the first to be incorporated within the city limits that year.

Over the Soviet time, as city was expanding, the number of districts was gradually increasing. The districts has been also commonly named after Soviet party leaders, and as political situation was changing and some leaders were overturned by the other, so district names were also changing.

The last district reform took place in 2001 when the number of districts was decreased from 14 to 10.

Under Oleksandr Omelchenko (mayor from 1999 to 2006), there were further plans for the merger of some districts and revision of their boundaries, and the total number of districts had been planned to be decreased from 10 to 7. With the election of the new mayor-elect (Leonid Chernovetskyi) in 2006, these plans were conducted.

Districts of Kyiv 

Administratively, the city is divided into districts (raions), which have their own units of central and locally elected councils with jurisdiction over a limited scope of affairs. Between 2010 and 2022 the Kyiv district councils were abolished.

The last Kyiv district reorganization took place in 2001, and currently Kyiv districts are:
  Darnytskyi District (Дарницький район)
  Desnianskyi District (Деснянський район; after the Desna river)
  Dniprovskyi District (Дніпровський район; after the Dnieper river)
  Holosiivskyi District (Голосіївський район)
  Obolonskyi District (Оболонський район)
  Pecherskyi District (Печерський район)
  Podilskyi District (Подільський район)
  Shevchenkivskyi District (Шевченківський район; after Taras Shevchenko)
  Solomianskyi District (Солом’янський район)
  Sviatoshynskyi District (Святошинський район)

Most of the districts are named after respective historical neighborhoods of the city.

Former districts

 Zaliznychny (9 April 1938 – October 2001), most of it became the Solomianskyi District
 Zhovtnevy (~1920s – October 2001), raion was created on the territory of Shuliavka that became famous for the Uprising of 1905, in 1938 khutor Vidradny was incorporated within the raion, later became the Solomianskyi District
 Minsk (? – 3 March 1975), renamed into Obolon Raion
 Starokyiv ( – October 2001), merged with Sovietsky to form Shevchenkivskyi District
 Sovietsky ( – October 2001), merged with Starokyiv to form Shevchenkivskyi District
 Leningrad (12 April 1973 – October 2001), formed out parts of Zhovtnevy, Sovietsky, and Shevchenko, later renamed into Sviatoshyn Raion
 Shevchenko (prior to 2001)
 Rakhiv-Sviatoshyn (January 1924 – April 1973), included Sviatoshyn sub-raion, later became Leningrad
 Sviatoshyn (1918 – 1924), created by an administrative reform of Pavlo Skoropadskyi, was incorporated as a sub-raion into Rakhiv-Sviatoshyn
 Moscow (1921 – October 2001), reorganized as Holosiivskyi District
 Kharkiv (? – 2004), became part of Darnytskyi District

Informal subdivision

The Right Bank and the Left Bank
The natural first level of subdivision of the city is into the Right Bank and the Left Bank of the Dnieper River (a few large islands belong to the left-bank raions).

The Right Bank, located on the western side of the river, contains the older portions of the city, as well as the majority of Kyiv's business and governmental institutions.

The eastern Left Bank, incorporated into the city only in the twentieth century, is predominantly residential. There are large industrial and green areas in both the Right Bank and the Left Bank.

The terms "Right Bank" and, especially, "Left Bank" are recognized in the names of Kyiv's infrastructure, e.g. "Livoberezhna" Metro station.

Historical neighborhoods
Residents widely recognize a system of the non-formal historical neighborhoods. Such neighborhoods count in dozens, however, constituting a kind of hierarchy, since most of them have lost their distinctive topographic limits.

The names of the oldest neighborhoods go back to the Middle Ages, and sometimes pose a great linguistic interest. The newest whole-built developments bear numeric designations or residential marketing names.

Most notable informal historical neighborhoods of Kyiv include:

Right Bank (west):

Left Bank (east):
Berezniaky (Березняки)
Bykivnia (Биківня)
Darnytsia (Дарниця)
Kharkivskyi masyv (Харківський)
Lisovyi masyv (Лісовий масив)
Livoberezhnyi masyv (Лівобережний масив)
Osokorky (Осокорки)
Pozniaky (Позняки)
Rusanivka (Русанівка)
Troyeshchyna (Троєщина)
Voskresenka (Воскресенка)

Lypky and Zvirynets of the Pecherskyi Raion are the most expensive areas to live. Koncha-Zaspa is arguably the most interesting neighborhood name dating back to the times of Kyivan Rus. A local legend explaining the name of a locality states the Rus warriors who felt asleep (zaspaly) during their watch at the outpost were killed (koncheni) by Golden Horde invaders. Koncha-Zaspa is now a prestigious area too.

Practical orientation patterns

Another useful pattern of city division is the Kyiv Metro system. However, metro lines do not cover significant parts of Kyiv, making such orientation very approximate (but easy for newcomers). Sometimes, the system of elektrychka train stops are used for the same purpose.

Names of well-known shopping malls, restaurants, night clubs are used for orientation purposes as well.

The full informal set of addresses in Kyiv (used, for example, in real estate advertising) would include:
 Formal raion
 Historical neighborhood
 Nearest metro station or train stop
 Formal address

Notes

References

See also
 History of Kyiv
 Administrative divisions of Ukraine

External links
 History of Administrative Subdivision of Kyiv, Kyiv City Department of Statistics.

History of Kyiv